Opinion polling for the next United Kingdom general election is continually being carried out by various organisations to gauge voting intention. Most of the polling companies listed are members of the British Polling Council (BPC) and abide by its disclosure rules. The dates for these opinion polls range from the 2019 general election on 12 December to the present day.

Under the Dissolution and Calling of Parliament Act 2022, the next general election must be held no later than 24 January 2025. The Act ensures that, if it has not already been dissolved at the request of the prime minister, Parliament automatically dissolves five years after it first met (17 December 2024) and polling day occurs no more than 25 working days later taking into account Christmas Eve and bank holidays in any part of the United Kingdom.

Graphical summary 
The chart below shows opinion polls conducted for the next United Kingdom general election. The trend lines are local regressions (LOESS).

National poll results 
Poll results are listed in the table below in reverse chronological order. The highest percentage figure in each poll is displayed in bold, and its background is shaded in the leading party's colour. The "lead" column shows the percentage point difference between the two parties with the highest figures. When a poll result is a tie, the figures with the highest percentages are shaded and displayed in bold.

Most opinion polls do not cover Northern Ireland, which has different major political parties to the rest of the United Kingdom. This distinction is made in the table below in the area column, where "GB" means Great Britain, the island which contains England, Scotland and Wales and excludes Northern Ireland, and "UK" means United Kingdom, which includes Northern Ireland. Plaid Cymru only stand candidates in Wales and the SNP only stand candidates in Scotland. The parties with the greatest numbers of votes in the 2019 general election are listed here. Other parties are listed in the "Others" column.

2023

2022

2021

2020

Seat predictions 
Most polls are reported in terms of the overall popular vote share, and the pollsters do not typically project how these shares would equate to numbers of seats in the House of Commons. Other organisations including Electoral Calculus make rolling projections based on an aggregate of publicly available polls. A small number of large polls have been carried out to run multilevel regression with poststratification (MRP) models, which output predictions for each constituency.

Polling in the nations and regions

London

Scotland

Wales

Constituency polling

Chingford and Woodford Green

Wokingham

Wycombe

Other polling

Local elections polling 
Focaldata published a poll in February 2023 garnering voting intention for the forthcoming local elections that May.

Selected Conservative seats gained in 2019 

Polling firms publish polls of the "red wall", which take respondents from a selection of constituencies gained by the Conservatives in the 2019 general election. Different pollsters use different sets of constituencies for their polling.

Deltapoll 

Deltapoll have published a poll of the 57 constituencies that the Conservatives gained from Labour and the Liberal Democrats without specifying any regions.

Focaldata 

Focaldata have published a poll of the forty-four seats the Conservatives gained from Labour in northern England and the Midlands.

JL Partners 

JL Partners publishes polls of forty-five seats the Conservative Party gained from the Labour Party across northern England, the Midlands and Wales, apart from Bridgend, Clwyd South, the Vale of Clwyd, Wrexham and Ynys Môn.

Redfield  Wilton Strategies  
Redfield & Wilton Strategies publishes polls of 37 constituencies won by the Conservatives in 2019 that had been held by Labour in 2010, 2015 and 2017, as well as Burnley, Redcar and Vale of Clwyd

YouGov 

YouGov publishes polls of all fifty seats the Conservative Party gained from the Labour Party across northern England, the Midlands and Wales.

Selected Conservative seats 

Polling firms publish polls of the "blue wall", which take respondents from constituencies held by the Conservatives but which might be gained by Labour or the Liberal Democrats. Different pollsters use different sets of constituencies for their polling.

JL Partners 

JL Partners have published a poll of the forty-five seats in southern England which the Conservatives won in 2019 with a majority of under 10,000 votes.

Opinium 

Opinium published a poll of the forty-one constituencies held by the Conservatives since 2010, where Labour or the Liberal Democrats outperformed their national swing against the Conservatives in 2017 and 2019, with a majority of under 10,000.

Redfield  Wilton Strategies 
Redfield and Wilton Strategies publishes polls of the forty-two constituencies in southern England which voted Conservative in the last three general elections, where more than a quarter of adults have degrees, where more than 42.5% of voters are estimated to have voted to remain in the European Union in the 2016 referendum, and where the Conservative majority over Labour was under 10,000 or the Conservative majority over the Liberal Democrats was under 15,000, in the 2019 general election.

YouGov 

YouGov specifies the blue wall to be constituencies held by the Conservative Party in the South or East of England in the 2019 election, with a population which by majority voted to remain in the European Union and have a higher level of graduates than the country at large.

Other geographical samples

Find Out Now 

Find Out Now conducted a poll of voters in England and Wales.

Survation 
Survation has conducted a poll of voters in Cornwall, Cumbria, Gwynedd, Norfolk, and North Yorkshire.

Survation has conducted a poll of voters in Coventry.

YouGov 

YouGov produced a poll of seats in South West England that had elected a Conservative MP in every election since the 2015 general election and where a majority of voters were estimated to have voted to leave the European Union in the 2016 United Kingdom European Union membership referendum. They branded these seats the "Conservative Celtic Fringe".

YouGov have also conducted a poll of voters in constituencies which contain settlements identified by the Office for National Statistics as coastal towns.

Ethnic minority voters

See also 
 Leadership approval opinion polling for the next United Kingdom general election
 Opinion polling on the United Kingdom's membership of the European Union (2016–2020)
 Opinion polling on the United Kingdom rejoining the European Union (2020–present)

Notes

References 

United Kingdom
Opinion polling for United Kingdom general elections
Opinion polling for United Kingdom votes in the 2020s